The anime television series Code Geass by Sunrise has been adapted by Kadokawa Shoten into five separate manga adaptations, each containing an alternate storyline. The first four of the manga series have been licensed for an English language release in North America by Bandai Entertainment. The first, Code Geass: Lelouch of the Rebellion, by Majiko~! and originally serialized Monthly Asuka, focused on the protagonist of the series, Lelouch Lamperouge, with few differences from the anime's basic storyline. Its chapters were collected in eight tankōbon volumes released from December 26, 2006 to March 26, 2010. Bandai's English adaptation of the series was published from July 29, 2008 to February 15, 2011.

It was written by Atsuro Yomino and serialized in Beans A magazine. It focuses on the character Suzaku Kururugi in an alternate reality, where he fights against the criminal organization known as the Black Knights. It was released in two volumes on June 26, 2007 and September 26, 2008. The first English volume was released on January 6, 2009, and the second followed it on October 13, 2009.

The third manga series, serialized in Comp Ace and written by Tomomasa Takuma, focuses on Lelouch's sister, Nunnally Lamperouge who goes into searching her missing brother when her health is restored by an entity named Nemo. It was published in five volumes from June 26, 2007 to April 25, 2009. The English volumes were published from June 9, 2009 to March 23, 2010.

A fourth manga adaptation, was serialized in Kerokero Ace as written by Tomomasa Takuma. Set in an alternate 1853, Lelouch is the commander of the Shogunate's military counterinsurgence brigade known as the Shinsengumi, which fights the Black Revolutionaries, a rebel group led by a masked individual known as Rei. It was released on a single volume on October 25, 2010, while the English version will be published on May 10, 2011.

In late 2009, Bandai announced a new project greenlit for 2010. A manga titled  by Tomomasa Takuma is the first product announced. The story takes place in the same official Code Geass history as the anime, but in a different era with the anime director Goro Taniguchi is scripting the story. The title character, Renya, is a teenager who encounters the witch C.C. who gives him power to protect his friends. It began publication in the May 2010 issue of Shōnen Ace, with its first volume published on January 26, 2011. Although Bandai had the series licensed by July 2011, they revoked publishing as a result of the company's restructuring.

Volume list

Code Geass: Lelouch of the Rebellion

Code Geass: Suzaku of the Counterattack

Code Geass: Nightmare of Nunnally

Code Geass: Tales of an Alternate Shogunate

Code Geass: Renya of Darkness

Code Geass: OZ the Reflection

Code Geass: OZ the Reflection O2

Code Black: Lelouch of the Shred Guitar

References

 
Code Geass